Kartar Singh Duggal (1 March 1917 – 26 January 2012) was an Indian writer who wrote in Punjabi, Urdu, Hindi, and English. His works include short stories, novels, dramas and plays. His works have been translated into Indian and foreign languages. He has served as director of the All India Radio.

He was awarded the Padma Bhushan by Government of India in 1988. In 2007, he was awarded the Sahitya Akademi Fellowship, the highest honour given by Sahitya Akademi, India's National Academy of Letters.

Early life and education

He was born in Dhamyal, Rawalpindi District, (now in Pakistan) to Mr Jiwan Singh Duggal and Mrs Satwant Kaur. He was married to Ayesha Duggal (formerly Ayesha Minhaj), a medical doctor. He received his M.A. Honours in English at Forman Christian College, Lahore.

Career
Duggal started his professional career with All India Radio (AIR). He worked there from 1942 to 1966 in various jobs including Station Director. For the AIR, he wrote and produced programmes in Punjabi and other languages. In addition, he authored a large number of plays and dramas. He was the Secretary/Director, National Book Trust, India from 1966 to 1973. From 1973 to 1976, he served as an Information Advisor at the Ministry of Information and Broadcasting (Planning Commission).

He has founded many institutions, including:
Raja Rammohun Roy Library Foundation
Institute of Social and Economic Change, Bangalore
Zakir Husain Educational Foundation

Duggal had been a member of many literary and cultural centres including being the President of Punjabi Sahitya Sabha (Punjabi Literary Society), Delhi. He was nominated Fellow of the Punjabi University in 1984. He was also honoured with a nomination to the Rajya Sabha (Indian Parliament Upper House) in August 1997.

He died on 26 January 2012 after a brief illness.

Work
Duggal has authored twenty-four collections of short stories, ten novels, seven plays, seven works of literary criticism, two poetry collections and an autobiography. Many of his books have been adopted by various universities for graduate studies. Among his works are:

Short stories
Birth of a Song (in English)
Come Back My Master (in English)
Dangar (Animal)
Ikk Chhit Chananh Di (One Drop of Light)
’’ swere sar’’
’’pipal patea’’
Nawan Ghar (New House)
Sonar Bangla (Golden Bungalow)
Tarkalan Vele (In the Evening)
Jeenat Aapa(A Muslim girl)
A Room 10'x 8'

PoetryVeehveen Sadi te Hor Kavitaavaan (Twentieth Century and Other Poems)Kandhe Kandhe (Shore Shore)

NovelsSarad Poonam Ki Raat (A Cold Full Moon Night)Tere Bhanhe (Your Wishes)Nails and flesh (1969)
"Man Pardesi"(1982)
"Ab Na Bassoon ih gaon" (Hindi-1996)

Other worksSat Natak (True Nanak) (One-Act Play)Band Darwaaze (Closed Doors)Mitti Musalmaan Ki (A Muslim's Earth)Philosophy and Faith of Sikhism, Himalayan Institute Press, 1988. .Giani Gurmukh Singh Musafir'', New Delhi: National Book Trust, 1999. .

Awards
Kartar Singh Duggal has been bestowed by many awards throughout his career, including:

Padma Bhushan
Sahitya Akademi Award
Ghalib Award
Soviet Land Award
Bharatiya Bhasha Parishad Award
Bhai Mohan Singh Vaid Award
Bhartiya Bhasa Parishad Award
Punjabi Writer of the Millennium, Award of Government of Punjab
Bhai Vir Singh Award (1989) presented by the Vice-President of India for outstanding literary contribution
Praman Patra (1993) presented by the Chief Minister of Punjab for outstanding contribution to Punjabi literature
Sahir Award (1998)by Adeeb International (Sahir Cultural Academy) Ludhiana, India
He is well travelled. He has visited Bulgaria, North Korea, Russia, Singapore, Sri Lanka, Tunisia, the UK and the U.S. He resided in New Delhi after retirement and spent his time reading.

The Library of Congress has 118 of his works.

See also
 Indian literature
 List of Indian writers

References

External links
Kartar Singh Duggal, Biography
 Grand Amateur of Punjabi Letters: Kartar Singh Duggal (1917-2012)
 K.S. and Ayesha Duggal talking about their experiences of Partition, their romance, and the plight of abducted women

Punjabi-language writers
1917 births
2012 deaths
Punjabi academics
Writers from Punjab, India
People from Rawalpindi District
Forman Christian College alumni
Punjabi people
All India Radio people
Indian autobiographers
Indian Sikhs
Indian literary critics
Indian male dramatists and playwrights
Indian male short story writers
Recipients of the Sahitya Akademi Award in Punjabi
Nominated members of the Rajya Sabha
Recipients of the Padma Bhushan in literature & education
Recipients of the Sahitya Akademi Fellowship
20th-century Indian short story writers
20th-century Indian dramatists and playwrights
20th-century Indian male writers